Acaulospora koskei is a species of fungus in the family Acaulosporaceae. It forms arbuscular mycorrhiza and vesicles in roots. Found in Poland, where it was collected from soil under Ammophila arenaria, it was described as a new species in 1996.

References

Diversisporales
Fungi described in 1955
Fungi of Europe